Below is a list of List of One Piece chapters. One Piece is one of the longest currently running manga in the world. There are several lists to list all the chapters.

Lists of main series chapters
 List of One Piece chapters 1 to 186
 List of One Piece chapters 187 to 388
 List of One Piece chapters 389 to 594
 List of One Piece chapters 595 to 806
 List of One Piece chapters 807 to 1015
 List of One Piece chapters 1016 to now

Special chapters

Canon content from other manga

List of non-canon chapters

Early One Piece

Alternate reality stories

One Piece crossovers

See also
List of One Piece manga volumes

Notes

References